This timeline of Manchester Metrolink lists significant events in the history of Greater Manchester's light rail network.

1960s
1968
The Transport Act 1968 sets out the terms under which passenger transport executives and passenger transport authorities are to be formed to co-ordinate and operate public transport in the United Kingdom's six largest conurbations outside London.
1969
SELNEC PTE (the South East Lancashire North East Cheshire Passenger Transport Executive) is established on 1 November 1969 with reference to the Transport Act 1968 to improve public transport in Manchester and its surrounding municipalities.

1970s
1972
The Picc-Vic tunnel receives planning approval from the Parliament of the United Kingdom.
The Local Government Act 1972 receives Royal Assent on 26 October 1972. The Act sets out provisions to reform local government in England by creating a system of two-tier metropolitan and non-metropolitan counties and districts across the country. Manchester and its surrounding municipalities are to be amalgamated as a metropolitan county.
1973
A government grant to fund the £86 million Picc-Vic tunnel is rejected amid a weak economic climate.
The United Kingdom local elections of 12 April 1973 creates the Greater Manchester County Council (GMCC) as a shadow authority.
1974
The Greater Manchester County Council publishes its structure plan in January 1974, acknowledging its obligation to provide "an integrated and efficient system of public transport".
Greater Manchester is formally established as a metropolitan county of England on 1 April 1974; SELNEC PTE becomes the Greater Manchester Passenger Transport Executive (GMPTE), a functional body of the Greater Manchester County Council tasked with operating and improving public transport in the region.
Greater Manchester County Council submit a bid to the United Kingdom Government to acquire funding for the Picc-Vic tunnel. 
1977
Unable to secure funding from the government, the Greater Manchester County Council abandons plans for the Picc-Vic tunnel on economic grounds.

1980s

1982
GMPTE conclude that an overground metropolitan light rail system to replace or complement the region's under-used heavy railways is the most economical solution to improving Greater Manchester's public transport network.
1983
As part of its proposals for light rail, GMPTE suggest that the Oldham Loop Line be re-routed and extended with on-street tramways through Oldham and Rochdale town centres.
The Greater Manchester County Council purchases a disused section of the Cheshire Lines Committee railway between Chorlton-cum-Hardy and Didsbury for £1, hoping to stop development along the route and preserve it for use with a future light rail network.
1984
A Rail Study Group composed of officials from British Rail, Greater Manchester County Council and GMPTE, formally endorse a light rail system for Greater Manchester.
1985
The Local Government Act 1985 receives Royal Assent on 16 July 1985, stating that "the Greater London Council; and the metropolitan county councils" shall cease to exist.
1986
The Greater Manchester County Council is abolished on 31 March 1986 under the Local Government Act 1985. GMPTE becomes a joint-board of the ten district councils of Greater Manchester.
GMPTE propose that Greater Manchester's light rail system include a line to Salford Quays to complement the regeneration of the Manchester Docks. 
1987
A trial and public demonstration on 9 February 1987 uses Docklands Light Railway rolling stock on the freight-only Fallowfield Loop line adjacent to Debdale Park in Gorton.
1988
Plans to create a light rail line through Oldham and Rochdale town centres are laid before the Parliament of the United Kingdom.
The name Metrolink and a system-wide aquamarine, black and grey corporate branding and vehicle livery is revealed at a press launch in June 1988.
1989
On 27 September 1989, following a two-stage tender exercise, the Greater Manchester Passenger Transport Authority award a contract to the GMA Group (a consortium composed of AMEC, GM Buses, John Mowlem & Company and a General Electric Company subsidiary) who in turn form Greater Manchester Metro Limited to design, build, operate and maintain Phase 1 of Metrolink.
Michael Portillo approves the Metrolink construction contract on behalf of the Department for Transport on 24 October 1989.

1990s

1990
The contract to design, build, maintain and operate Metrolink is formally signed on 6 June 1990.
Legal authority to construct a Metrolink line to Salford Quays is acquired.

1991
The Bury Line between Manchester and Bury is closed in stages between 13 July 1991 and 17 August 1991. Its 1200 V DC third rail electrified line is adapted for a 750 V DC overhead line operation. 
1992
Metrolink begins its first passenger service on 6 April 1992 on a route between Victoria and Bury. 
Metrolink services expand beyond Victoria to G-Mex tram stop on 27 April 1992.
Phase 1 on Metrolink's construction is completed with a service through to Altrincham joining the network on 15 June 1992.
Elizabeth II declares Metrolink open at a ceremony in Manchester on 17 July 1992, stating that Metrolink would "improve communication" between northern and southern Greater Manchester.
1994
A public consultation and public inquiry result in government endorsement of a Metrolink line to Salford Quays in 1994.
1995
In autumn 1995 a  Metrolink line branching from Cornbrook tram stop to Eccles via Salford Quays is confirmed as Phase 2 of Metrolink. 
1997
In April 1997 Altram, a consortium of the Serco, Gio. Ansaldo & C. and John Laing is appointed to construct the Eccles line; Serco takes on responsibility to operate and maintain the whole network under contract.
Serco Metrolink, a wholly owned subsidiary of Serco Limited, take over the operations and maintenance of Metrolink on 26 May 1997. 
Construction of the Eccles Line officially begins on 17 July 1997.
1999
The Eccles Line is officially opened as far as Broadway tram stop on 6 December 1999 by Prime Minister, Tony Blair, who praises Metrolink as "exactly the type of scheme needed to solve the transport problems of the metropolitan areas of the country".

2000s
2000
Services from Broadway to Eccles Interchange join the network on 21 July 2000, completing Phase 2.
2001
The Eccles Line is declared open by Anne, Princess Royal at a ceremony on 9 January 2001.
2003
In March 2003, Serco Investments buy out its partners; Altram (Manchester) Limited becomes a wholly owned subsidiary of Serco.
2004
A derailment occurs at Shudehill on 31 August 2004.
2005
A derailment occurs on London Road on 11 January 2005.
Work on Central Park tram stop and a flyover at Newton Heath over the heavy Caldervale Line commences in April 2005.
On 8 November 2005 a near miss occurs between two track workers and a tram; the tram ran over track maintenance equipment.
2006
A derailment occurs on 22 March 2006 at Long Millgate, Manchester, as a result of a track defect.
A person becomes trapped under a Metrolink vehicle on 20 May 2006, causing a three-hour delay on the system.
2007
A derailment occurs on 17 January 2007 at Pomona tram stop.
In July 2007 a 10-year contract to operate Metrolink was awarded to Stagecoach Metrolink, a subsidiary of the Stagecoach Group.
GMPTE and the Association of Greater Manchester Authorities (AGMA) submit a joint bid to the Transport Innovation Fund in July 2007, in order to procure a multi-million pound sum for public transport improvements linked to an anti-road traffic congestion strategy. 
2008
A derailment occurs on 29 June 2008 the junction of Princess and Mosley Street sin central Manchester.
A referendum on the Greater Manchester Transport Innovation Fund is held in Greater Manchester on 19 December 2008, in which 79% of voters reject plans for public transport improvements linked to a peak-time weekday-only Greater Manchester congestion charge.

2009
In May 2009, Greater Manchester Integrated Transport Authority (formerly GMPTA) and AGMA agree to create the Greater Manchester Transport Fund, £1.5billion raised from a combination of a levy on council tax in Greater Manchester, government grants, contributions from the Manchester Airports Group, Metrolink fares and third-party funding for "major transport schemes" in the region. 
The Oldham Loop Line closes on 3 October 2009 for conversion from heavy rail to Metrolink.

2010s
2010
Phase 3b is approved with funding on a line-by-line basis between March and August 2010. 
MediaCityUK tram stop station opens to passengers on 20 September 2010.

2011
Construction work on Phase 3b begins in March 2011.
The Greater Manchester Combined Authority is established on 1 April 2011; GMPTE becomes Transport for Greater Manchester (TfGM) and receives additional powers over transport in Greater Manchester.
A pedestrian is struck by a Metrolink vehicle at Piccadilly Gardens on 5 June 2011. The pedestrian dies later in hospital.
Kingsway Business Park tram stop is authorised in July 2011; Drake Street tram stop is abandoned on technical and economic grounds.
RATP Group buys the operating concession from Stagecoach Group on 1 August 2011.

2012
On the Airport Line, a bridge over the M56 motorway, north of Hollyhedge Road in Wythenshawe, is installed on the night of 24–25 November 2012.
Services on the Oldham and Rochdale Line from Oldham Mumps to Shaw and Crompton tram stop commence on 16 December 2012.
A derailment occurs on 21 December 2012 at Market Street, Manchester.
2013

On 6 February 2013, a heavy goods vehicle collides with a tram in Weaste.
The Phase 3a element of the East Manchester Line opens to the general public on 11 February 2013, adding 8 new stops to the network at New Islington, Holt Town, Etihad Campus, Velopark, Clayton Hall, Edge Lane, Cemetery Road, Droylsden.
Driver training begins on the Oldham and Rochdale Line between Shaw and Crompton and Rochdale railway station on 11 February 2013.
Phase 3a is completed with the extension of services along the Oldham and Rochdale Line from Shaw and Crompton and Rochdale railway station on 28 February 2013. Metrolink becomes  in system length.
Mosley Street tram stop closes on 17 May 2013 as part of a plan to remove a bottleneck in Manchester city centre. 
The  route of the South Manchester Line from St Werburgh's Road to East Didsbury tram stop opens on 23 May 2013 – three months ahead of schedule. It is the first section of Phase 3b line to open, and adds five new stops to the network.
On 8 July 2013, TfGM announces that overnight testing is to commence on the Phase 3b routes between Rochdale railway station and Rochdale Town Centre tram stop, and Droylsden and Ashton-under-Lyne tram stop.
On 31 July 2013, a man walks in front of a tram at Freehold tram stop, in Chadderton. Paramedics pronounce him dead at the scene.
On 1 August 2013, a car collides with a tram on Mosley Street in Manchester city centre.
On 3 August 2013, tram 3056, which was not in service, derails at the entrance to the Queen's Road depot.
The Institute of Economic Affairs publishes its appraisal of High Speed 2 on 19 August 2013, raising concerns that the high-speed railway will require indirect taxpayer funding by way of providing additional or enhanced infrastructure to integrate it with local transport systems. It cites Metrolink as an example of a system that would require modification to accommodate HS2 in Manchester.
Trams are tested on the Phase 3b route through Oldham town centre on 20 August 2013.
At the end of August 2013, a partnership consisting of Arup Group, Bennetts Associates, High Speed Two and Manchester City Council publish draft proposals on the remodelling of Manchester Piccadilly station and its surrounds to accommodate and capitalise on High Speed 2. Included are two options on how Metrolink could be modified at Piccadilly as part of remodelling and enhancement work.
During the first week of September 2013, trams are tested on the Phase 3b route between Droylsden and Ashton-under-Lyne tram stop.
On 10 September 2013, a full Tameside Council meeting heard 9 October 2013 announced as the opening date for the Phase 3b route between Droylsden and Ashton-under-Lyne tram stop.
Construction work begins in mid-September 2013 to remodel the staff halt at Metrolink House in Cheetham Hill as Queens Road tram stop.

2014
3 November 2014: Extension opened from St Werburgh's Road to Manchester Airport.

2015
28 June 2015: St Peter's Square tram stop closes for redevelopment into a four platform stop.
6 December 2015: Exchange Square tram stop becomes operational as the first part of the Second City Crossing opens.

2016
26 June 2016: Start of a two-month closure of the Eccles Line for essential track maintenance.

2017
26 February 2017: The 2nd City Crossing (2CC) opens between St Peter's Square and Victoria via Exchange Square
15 July 2017: Keolis/Amey take over from RATP Group as operator

2020s
2020
 22 March 2020: The Trafford Park Line opened.

See also
 List of tram and light-rail transit systems
 Manchester Corporation Tramways
 Transport in Manchester

References

Bibliography

External links

 www.lrta.org/manchester , a historical account of Metrolink from the Light Rail Transit Association
 www.metrolink.co.uk, the official Metrolink website
 www.metrolinkpromotions.co.uk, for official marketing, promotion and events
 www.tfgm.com, the official website of Transport for Greater Manchester

Manchester Metrolink
Rail transport timelines
History of transport in Greater Manchester
Manchester Metrolink